Patrick Crowe (17 February 1892 – 8 August 1969) was an Irish Fine Gael politician who represented Tipperary South.

A farmer, Crowe was elected to Dáil Éireann as a Fine Gael Teachta Dála (TD) for the Tipperary South constituency at the 1951 general election, having been an unsuccessful candidate at the 1948 general election. He retained his seat at the 1954 general election but lost it at the 1957 general election. He was elected to the 9th Seanad on the Agricultural Panel at the 1957 Seanad election. He was not re-elected to the Seanad in 1961.

References

1892 births
1969 deaths
Fine Gael TDs
Members of the 14th Dáil
Members of the 15th Dáil
Members of the 9th Seanad
Irish farmers
Politicians from County Tipperary
Fine Gael senators